Augusta is an unincorporated community in Lockhart Township, Pike County, in the U.S. state of Indiana.

History
The first permanent settlement at Augusta was made in the 1860s. A post office was established at Augusta in 1874, and remained in operation until 1920.

Geography

References

Unincorporated communities in Pike County, Indiana
Unincorporated communities in Indiana